Marvin Wanitzek (born 7 May 1993) is a German professional footballer who plays for 2. Bundesliga side Karlsruher SC as an attacking midfielder.

Career
Wanitzek joined VfB Stuttgart in July 2013 from FC Astoria Walldorf. On 28 October 2015, he made his debut for the first team in the 2015–16 DFB-Pokal against Carl Zeiss Jena. He had his first Bundesliga appearance with Stuttgart on 29 November 2015 against Borussia Dortmund.

In June 2017, he signed for 3. Liga club Karlsruher SC on a three-year deal until 2020. In January 2020, he agreed a contract extension until summer 2024.

Personal life
Wanitzek is of Polish descent.

Career statistics

References

External links
 

Living people
1993 births
Association football midfielders
German footballers
German people of Polish descent
Footballers from Baden-Württemberg
VfB Stuttgart II players
VfB Stuttgart players
Karlsruher SC players
FC Astoria Walldorf players
Bundesliga players
2. Bundesliga players
3. Liga players
Regionalliga players